A game show is a type of show in which contestants play a game, usually for money or prizes.

Game Show or Gameshow may also refer to:

 Gameshow (album), a 2016 album by Two Door Cinema Club
 "Game Show" (Dexter's Laboratory episode), a second-season episode of the American television series Dexter's Laboratory

See also	
 Game Show Network, an American television channel